Manohar Rajusingh Naik is an Indian politician of the Nationalist Congress Party in the state of Maharashtra. 
The Naik family has not lost the  Pusad (Vidhan Sabha constituency) Seat since 1952.

The Naik family has tremendous influence over Banjara community, a scheduled tribe, which is in significant number in Yavatmal and a deciding factor in Pusad constituency.

Personal life
Naik was born in 1943 born at the remote Yawali village near Chapdoh dam, 3 km from Karegaon on Karegaon-Ramnagar-Yawali link road off Yavatmal-Ghatanji State highway MH SH 237, in the Yavatmal district in the southern Vidarbha region of Maharashtra. He is nephew of former Chief Minister of Maharashtra Vasantrao Naik and brother of former Chief Minister of Maharashtra Sudhakarrao Naik.

Career
Naik has been elected as Member of the Legislative Assembly
from the Pusad (Vidhan Sabha constituency) of the Maharashtra Legislative Assembly in Yavatmal district from 1995 to 1999, 2004–2009, 2009–2014, and 2014–2019.
 
From 2009 to 2014, he was the Minister of Food and Drug Administration in the Government of Maharashtra in India.

He is a Managing Committee member of the Janta Shikshan Prasarak Mandal and the Babasaheb Naik College of Engineering, Pusad.

References

Marathi politicians
1943 births
Living people
People from Yavatmal district
Maharashtra MLAs 2004–2009
Maharashtra MLAs 1995–1999
Nationalist Congress Party politicians from Maharashtra
Maharashtra MLAs 2009–2014
Maharashtra MLAs 2014–2019